Hardinge, Inc. is a multi-national machine tool builder with global headquarters in Berwyn, PA, USA. It began operation in 1890. Hardinge is best known for its lathes, both non-CNC and CNC.

Hardinge Inc. machine tool brands now include Hardinge, Bridgeport, Kellenberger, Usach, Hauser, Jones & Shipman, Voumard, and Tschudin. It currently has locations in the United States, England, Germany, Switzerland, China, Taiwan and India. 

On May 29, 2018, Privet Fund Management LLC completed the acquisition of Hardinge, Inc. for approximately $245 million.

The company employs approximately 1500 staff.

References

External links

Machine tool builders
Tool manufacturing companies of the United States
Companies based in New York (state)
Manufacturing companies established in 1890
1890 establishments in New York (state)
2018 mergers and acquisitions
Companies formerly listed on the Nasdaq